The My Buddy doll line was a toy brand made by Hasbro in 1985 with the intention of making a doll to appeal to young boys and teach them about caring for their friends. This idea was both innovative and controversial for its time, as toy dolls were traditionally associated with younger girls. Hasbro also introduced a companion Kid Sister marketed toward girls. Hasbro discontinued the line before the start of the 1990s and Playskool took over production, making changes to the likeness and clothing.

My Buddy is one of several dolls said to be the inspiration for Chucky, the evil doll from Child's Play.

Hasbro
During its initial run, My Buddy had the following characteristics:
red baseball cap
brown hair
red/yellow/blue/white striped long-sleeved shirt
red overalls with "My Buddy" logo on chest
 white socks
blue shoes with white stripe
the whole doll (besides head) was stuffed fabric.
face had blue or brown eyes, freckles, "button" nose, and smile

Two versions of the dolls existed: the brown-haired version described above, and a blond version:
blue baseball cap
blond hair
red/yellow/blue/white striped long-sleeved shirt
blue overalls with "My Buddy" logo on chest
 white socks
red shoes with white stripe
the whole doll (besides head) was stuffed fabric.
face had blue or brown eyes, freckles, "button" nose, and smile

An African American version, outfitted the same as the brown-haired Caucasian doll, was available.

Playskool
The dolls released by Playskool in the 1990s were made with unremovable clothing sewn directly onto the doll's body. The new Kid Sister was also released with clothes sewn onto the body, despite complaints, making it virtually impossible to dress it in different outfits. This was done to reduce the extra cost of having to produce clothes separately, so it was all kept on one assembly line.

Advertising
The "official" song used in marketing the doll in advertisements was:

"My Buddy, My Buddy,
Wherever I go, he goes.
My Buddy, My Buddy,
I'll teach him everything that I know.

My Buddy and me,
Like to climb up a tree.
My buddy and me,
We're the best friends that could be.

My Buddy, My Buddy,
My Buddy and Me!"

In popular culture
The doll was jokingly depicted as My Stalker in an episode of Adult Swim's Robot Chicken.
The doll was parodied in Clarence as Clarence's Li'l Buddy doll, in an episode of the same name.

In season 2, episode 11, episode "Meat the Parrots" of the show Happy Endings, Penny complains that she never had a kid sister; the closest she got was a My Buddy doll. When asked why she never got a Kid Sister doll, she said she did, but they weren't that close.
On the Bleacher Report podcast Simms & Lefkoe, Chris Simms parodies the commercial theme of My Buddy as "My Homie" in an homage to Kansas City Chiefs quarterback Patrick Mahomes.
In the music video for Wanksta, by rapper 50 cent, there is a likeness of the My Buddy doll that presents a more 'gangster look'.
The song Growing Pains by Ludacris makes a reference to the My Buddy theme song ("Wherever I go they went, they my buddies").

References

1980s toys
Doll brands
Hasbro products
Products introduced in 1985